Novy Rychan is a rural locality (a selo) and the administrative center of Khutorskoy Selsoviet of Volodarsky District, Astrakhan Oblast, Russia. The population was 997 as of 2010. There are 20 streets.

Geography 
Novy Rychan is located 23 km west of Volodarsky (the district's administrative centre) by road. Razdor is the nearest rural locality.

Gallery

References 

Rural localities in Volodarsky District, Astrakhan Oblast